Telmatobius schreiteri is a species of frog in the family Telmatobiidae.
It is endemic to Argentina.
Its natural habitat is rivers.
It is threatened by habitat loss.

References

schreiteri
Amphibians of Argentina
Endemic fauna of Argentina
Taxonomy articles created by Polbot
Amphibians described in 1946